Metro S.A. is a Greek supermarket chain based in the Metamorfosi suburb of Athens, Greece.

It was established in 1976 as a partnership of eight independent grocery stores. In the same year, Metro opened its first self-branded supermarket in Athens.  Today (2015) the company has  108 stores all over Greece. 62 of its stores (usually sized between 1000-2000 m2) operate under the brand name My Market, while the remaining 46 (usually sized over 2000 m2) operate under the brand name Metro Cash & Carry.  Metro is the sixth largest supermarket chain in Greece as measured by market share.

External links 

 Metro supermarkets website 

Supermarkets of Greece
Retail companies established in 1976
1976 establishments in Greece
Companies based in Attica